Oil sticks or oil bars are an art medium. Oil sticks are oil paint in a stick form similar to that of a crayon or pastel. Oil sticks are made by blending the oil and pigment with wax and pouring it into molds to form an oil stick. It is distinguished from oil pastels in that a drying oil such as linseed oil is used as the main binder whereas oil pastels use a non-drying oil as the primary binder. Oil sticks can be used interchangeably with traditional oil paints to produce drawings, paintings, and sketches. Popularized in the 1980s by such artists as Jean-Michel Basquiat, oil sticks have become much more common in contemporary oil painting in recent years.

See also
 List of artistic media

References

Visual arts materials